The 2018–19 Tahiti Cup (also known as Coupe Tahiti Nui) was the 80th edition of the national cup in Tahitian football. AS Dragon were the defending champions. The winner, A.S. Vénus, earned the right to represent Tahiti in the 2019–20 Coupe de France, entering at the seventh round.

Participating teams

Ligue 1 (10 Teams) 

AS Arue
AS Central Sport
AS Dragon
AS Jeunes Tahitiens
AS Manu-Ura
AS Pirae
AS Taiarapu
AS Tefana
A.S. Tiare Tahiti
AS Vénus

Ligue 2 (3 Teams) 

AS Excelsior
AS Olympique Mahina
AS Tamarii Punaruu

Ligue 2 Moorea (3 Teams) 

A.S. Mira
A.S. Tiare Hinano
AS Temanava

First round
All times are local TAHT (UTC-10)

Round of 8
All times are local TAHT (UTC-10)

Semi finals
The semi finals took place consecutively on 1 May 2019, at Stade Pater in Pirae.
All times are local TAHT (UTC-10)

Final
The final took place on 14 September 2019 at Stade Pater in Pirae

Top scorers

See also
2018–19 Tahiti Ligue 1
Tahiti Ligue 2

External links
Coupe de Tahiti Nui, Fédération Tahitienne de Football

References

Tahiti Cup
Tahiti
Cup